Dating and New York is a 2021 American comedy film written and directed by Jonah Feingold in his directorial debut. It stars Jaboukie Young-White, Francesca Reale, Catherine Cohen, Brian Muller, Jerry Ferrara, Arturo Castro, Taylor Hill, Alex Moffat, Eva Victor and Yedoye Travis.

It had its world premiere at Tribeca Film Festival on June 13, 2021. It was released on September 10, 2021 by IFC Films.

Cast

Production
In December 2019, it was announced Jaboukie Young-White, Francesca Reale, Catherine Cohen, Brian Muller, Jerry Ferrara, Arturo Castro, Taylor Hill, Alex Moffat, Eva Victor and Yedoye Travis had joined the cast of the film, with Jonah Feingold directing from a screenplay he wrote.

Principal photography began in October 2019. The film was shot in New York at 22 locations in 15 days.

Release
The film had its world premiere at the Tribeca Film Festival on June 13, 2021. Prior to the festival, IFC Films acquired distribution rights to the film. It was released in theaters by IFC Films on September 10, 2021.

Reception
On the review aggregator website Rotten Tomatoes, 41% of 22 critics' reviews are positive, with an average rating of 5.3/10. Metacritic, which uses a weighted average, assigned the film a score of 42 out of 100 based on six critics, indicating "mixed or average reviews".

References

External links
 

2021 films
2021 comedy films
2021 directorial debut films
2020s American films
2020s English-language films
American comedy films
Films shot in New York City
Films produced by Mason Novick
IFC Films films